The  1955-56 French Rugby Union Championship of first division was contested by 48 clubs divided in six pools of eight. The five better of each pool and the two better sixths (for a sum of 32 clubs) were qualified to play a "single match play-off" tournament.

The Championship was won by Lourdes that beat Dax in the final.

Preliminary phase 

In bold the clubs qualified for next round

Last 32
in bold the teams qualified for next round

Last 16
in bold the teams qualified for next round

Quarters of finals
in bold the teams qualified for next round

Semifinals

Final

External links
 Compte rendu finale de 1956 lnr.fr

1956
France 1956
Championship